Panopa is a genus of skinks, lizards in the family Scincidae. Member species are found in Brazil and Venezuela.

Species
The following two species, listed alphabetically by specific name, are recognized as being valid:

Panopa carvalhoi (Rebouças-Spieker & Vanzolini, 1990) – Carvalho's mabuya 
Panopa croizati (Horton, 1973) – Horton's mabuya

Nota bene: A binomial authority in parentheses indicates that the species was originally described in a genus other than Panopa.

References

Further reading
Heges SB, Conn CE (2012). "A new skink fauna from Caribbean islands (Squamata, Mabuyidae, Mabuyinae)". Zootaxa 3288: 1–244. (Panopa, new genus, p. 137).

 
Lizard genera
Lizards of South America
Taxa named by Stephen Blair Hedges
Taxa named by Caitlin E. Conn